Constantin Enache (July 4, 1928 – May 23, 2017) was a Romanian cross-country skier who competed in the 1950s. He finished 39th in the 18 km event at the 1952 Winter Olympics in Oslo. He was born in Buşteni.

References
18 km Olympic cross country results: 1948-52
Constantin Enache's obituary 

1928 births
2017 deaths
Romanian male cross-country skiers
Olympic cross-country skiers of Romania
Cross-country skiers at the 1952 Winter Olympics
Cross-country skiers at the 1956 Winter Olympics